The Painted Door is a Canadian short drama film, directed by Bruce Pittman and released in 1984. Based on a short story by Sinclair Ross, the film was produced by the National Film Board of Canada and Atlantis Films of Toronto. It received an Academy Award nomination for Best Live Action Short Film.

Synopsis
The Painted Door is a dark, downbeat film set during a cold prairie winter. Anne (Linda Goranson) stays alone in an isolated farmhouse while her husband, John (August Schellenberg), leaves to help his ailing father. A neighbour, Stephen (Eric Peterson), whom she secretly loves, drops by to help with the chores. When John doesn't return home that night, Anne gives in to temptation, only to wake the next day to the realization of what she has done.

Cast
 Linda Goranson
 Robert Michael
 Daniel Nalbach
 Eric Peterson
 August Schellenberg
 Len Watt

Distribution
The film received theatrical distribution in the United States, while in Canada it aired on Global Television Network as part of the Global Playhouse series of film adaptations of Canadian short stories.

Awards
 Yorkton Film Festival, Yorkton, Saskatchewan: Golden Sheaf Award, Best Drama Under 30 Minutes, 1985
 Yorkton Film Festival, Yorkton, Saskatchewan: Best Performance by an Actress, Linda Goranson, 1985
 Yorkton Film Festival, Yorkton, Saskatchewan: Best Script, Joe Wiesenfeld, 1985
 Columbus International Film & Animation Festival, Columbus, Ohio: Chris Award, Arts and Culture, 1986
 57th Academy Awards, Los Angeles: Nominee: Best Live Action Short Film, 1984

References

External links

1984 films
National Film Board of Canada short films
Films directed by Bruce Pittman
Canadian drama short films
1980s Canadian films